Esino Lario (locally  ) is a municipality (comune) of the Province of Lecco in the Italian region of Lombardy.

The area around Esino Lario is surrounded by Alpine mountains, where the karst landscape has produced sink-holes and caves, including the "Icebox of Moncodeno". The municipality is part of the Mountain Community of Valsassina, Valvarrone, Val d'Esino, and Riviera and is entirely within the "Regional Park of Northern Grigna" (Parco delle Grigna Settentrionale).

Esino Lario borders the municipalities of Cortenova, Lierna, Mandello del Lario, Parlasco, Pasturo, Perledo, Primaluna, Taceno, and Varenna.

Geography

The town is located in the Alpine foothills along the north-eastern slopes of Grigna mountain group,  from the eastern shore of Lake Como. It is located at the head of the small valley of Valsassina.

The presence of dolomite (rocks composed of calcium carbonate and magnesium) in the area, common to the rest of the foothills of the Alps of Lombardy, has led to the presence of numerous karst areas within the municipality.

In one of these caves, the Icebox of Moncodeno, are deposits of underground ice.

The locality is also characterised by the abundant presence of marine fossil deposits, a result of the geological history of the Alpine foothills, which emerged from the sea during the tectonic movements of the Alpine orogeny in the Cenozoic era. These deposits have long been studied by palaeontologists; among the first interested scholars was the geologist and palaeontologist Antonio Stoppani during the 19th century.

Climate

Esino Lario, like most of the Valsassina valley, features a humid, temperate climate, cooler than in the Po Valley due to the higher elevations. Precipitation is abundant, with more than  falling in an average year. Rainfall is frequent in every season, with a little less in winter when there can be snowfall. As in most temperate climates, there are prolonged and well-defined intermediate seasons.

Summers are moderate, with frequent rain showers and thunderstorms. This is due to the phenomenon of inversion (a deviation from the normal atmospheric behaviour, where temperature increases with elevation) frequently observed in midwinter when subtropical high-pressure systems reach northern Italy. Winters can become snowy, as extratropical cyclones carry moist and cool air from the North Atlantic.

History
The municipality of Esino Lario was created in 1927 by the merger of the municipalities of Lower Esino and Upper Esino.

Prehistory, Celts and Romans

The last glaciation of the quaternary period, the Würm, began 70,000 years ago covering the Como area, and it profoundly changed the land's appearance – shaping the sides of the mountains, creating fertile moraine terraces, leaving many signs of its passage with boulders. The landscape of Esino Lario testifies to the Alpine orogeny with the presence of fossils, boulders, and caves.

Human presence in the territory is documented since the Neolithic period. Esino archaeological findings from the 5th century BC  show that the area was a crossing point of the main road along the eastern shore of the lake, reaching Colico and the valleys of the Adda and Imera; because of overhanging rocks between Mandello and Bellano, from Lierna the road climbed to Ortanella (currently a frazione of Esino) subsequently declined to Vezio and Bellano. Archaeological finds testify numerous tombs and Celtic necropolis in Esino Lario. The area was a strategic point with detachments of warriors-pastors. During the late Western Roman Empire, to defend themselves from the incursions of the barbarians, the Romans prepared protective lines that communicated with each other by fires at night and smoke in the daytime. Castle Esino – of which only a tower remains – was one of the fortified points added to a defensive chain. Other archaeological finds with tombs buried document the period.

Middle Ages
At the fall of the Western Roman Empire, after the domination of Odoacer and of the Ostrogoths, the Byzantines conquered Italy during the Gothic War. Immediately after, however, the Lombards came down from Friuli and in 569 conquered Milan. A contingent from the Byzantine Empire, under the command of magister militum Francione, resisted in Esino Lario for 20 years, avoiding the large reprisals that followed the death of king Alboin and housing wealthy Roman refugees. In the end, Francione had to repair in Isola Comacina and, after six months of siege, surrender. The territory was finally conquered by the Lombard king Authari.

Towards the end of the 12th century, Esino Lario entered the  General Community of Valsassina, a free commune. It lays its statutes, derived from ancient practices. Each village was administered by its board, formed by the heads of families. A unique representative of both Esino Superiore and Iniferiore took part in the Council of the Community General, which was based in Introbio.

The Spanish domination
In the first decades of the sixteenth century, the eastern Lario was close to the armies involved in the dispute between France and Spain. An adventurer, Gian Giacomo Medici, attempted to form a principality on Lake Como and a fleet take long in check the forces of Francesco II Sforza. Bellano was plundered and famine raged in every village. A duke died without heirs, and Milan went to the Spanish in 1535. There followed two centuries of gradual decay: the archives of Esino reveal misery, oppression, robberies, and injustices. The only glimmer of light is the two pastoral visits of Charles Borromeo to Esino in 1565 and in 1582. The plague of 1630 claimed many victims in Valsassina; fifty in Esino. Along the rest of the century, then, was a continuous drip of starvation and hunger. In the late 17th century, despite the ancient privileges, Valsassina became a feud chamber.

Italian unification

Although a small town and then very poor, Esino participated in the Risorgimento movement (Italian reunification). At the news of the revolt in Milan in 1848, a  group came from Lecco and joined volunteers in the Esino Lario to come to the aid of the Milanese in their Five Days Rebellion. The first 50 years of the Kingdom of Italy were of economical crisis: wood was no longer required for the coal needed for melting furnaces, and could only be sold afar.

The reduction of glaciers was in progress, reducing the cultivated land, and population growth soon pushed emigration. Despite this decline, some public works were performed in the town: there were newly cobbled streets to the lake and to the mountain, and two aqueducts for public fountains were also constructed.

20th century
After  World War I, the local economy was boosted by the construction of a new agro-forestry-pastoral road, opened in 1925. The upper and lower municipalities merged in 1927 to form the new town of Esino Lario.

During late World War II, guerilla warfare against the Wehrmacht and RSI troops took place in the area. In 1958, the road from Lake Como was widened and paved, and in 1957 it reached Ortanella.

Economy
Historically the main economic activity of Esino Lario is linked to the cultivation of forests of beech and hornbeam. Esino Lario was part of a group of local municipalities that provided charcoal for iron production in Valsassina. The management of the forests as a common good is a peculiarity of Esino compared to neighbouring territories; forests still belong to the city and are divided for use between residents and partially transmitted by hereditary right.

Tourism in Esino Lario began in the late 19th century with scholars coming to study the fossils of Grigne.   During the 1970s, tourists coming in the summer period of each year reached 12,000. However, in the 1990s tourism began to decline, and the reducing snowfall meant the closure of skiing structures.

The town hosted Wikimania, an annual Wikimedia conference, in June 2016.

Culture 
The Museum of Grigne  was established in the 1930s. It details the evolution of man in the area from its origins until today. The museum is part of the Museum System of the Province of Lecco.
The Ecomuseum of Grigne is a municipal ecomuseum formed in 2008.
Esino Lario is noted for its annual Saint John's Eve procession.

Main sights
 Parish Church of San Vittore, dating from the fifteenth century.
 Church of St. Pietro in Ortanella
 Oratorio di San Nicolao.  It houses a shrine of military victims of World War I and II.
Villa Clotilde
Esino Tower

Transport
Esino Lario is served by the  Strada Provinciale 65.

People
Pietro Pensa, engineer and businessman, also the former mayor of Esino Lario
Enrico Mino, General of the Army Corps, Commander of the Carabinieri,  was born and buried in Esino Lario

Gallery

References

Sources
 David Robertson, Sarah Stewart, Italian Lakes, Hunter Publishing, 2004, p. 19.
 Richard Sale, Italian Lakes, Hunter Publishing, 2006, p. 112.
 Paulist Press, Beds and Blessings in Italy: A Guide to Religious Hospitality, Hidden Spring, 2010, p. 165.

External links

 Official website

Cities and towns in Lombardy